Nadia Magnenat Thalmann is a computer graphics scientist and robotician and is the founder and head of MIRALab at the University of Geneva. She has chaired the Institute for Media Innovation at Nanyang Technological University (NTU), Singapore from 2009 to 2021.

Biography

Thalmann received an MS in Psychology, an MS in Biology and a Master in Biochemistry at the University of Geneva. She obtained a PhD in Quantum Physics in 1977 from the same university. She started her career as an assistant professor at the University Laval in Canada, then became a professor at HEC, University of Montreal until 1988. In 1989, she moved to the University of Geneva where she founded the MIRALab laboratory.

Thalmann has authored and co-authored more than 600 papers in the area of Virtual Humans, social robots, VR, and 3D simulation of human articulations. She has participated in more than 45 European research projects. She has served the Computer Graphics community by creating the Computer Animation and Social Agents (CASA) in Geneva in 1988, as well as managing Computer Graphics International (CGI). She is the editor-in-chief of the journal The Visual Computer published by Springer, Germany and co editor-in-chief of the Computer Animation Journal published by Wiley.

Research
Thalmann has made numerous research contributions in the general area of computer graphics and is best known for her work on simulating realistic virtual humans. She also made early contributions in computer graphics during her PhD by simulating and visualizing 3D electronic densities of the Schrödinger equation's approximate solutions (1977).

Later on, she pioneered the modelling of realistic Virtual Humans, particularly producing the first simulation of a 3D version of Marilyn Monroe in the film Rendez-vous in Montreal (1987)

This film was shown in world premiere at the Place des Arts in Montreal to celebrate 100 years of engineering in Canada. She also showed her film at the Modern Art Museum in New York in 1988 along with Canadian computer artists.

She made several original contributions in MRI segmentation methods correlated with clinical findings. She also modelled the simulation of Virtual Ballerinas where their hip cartilage deformations can be visualized while dancing. She further demonstrates see-through knee articulations of real soccer players. Since 2008, she has started at MIRALab, University of Geneva, a research with the humanoid robot EVA and demonstrated a first model of a realistic robot showing emotions and having a memory model. She has worked on the social autonomous robot Nadine, modeled in her image, that is able to speak, recognize people and gestures, express mood and emotions, and remember actions. Nadine has been shown at the ArtScience Museum, in the exhibition HUMAN+: The Future of our Species, in Singapore, which has attracted more than 100 000 visitors.

Honors and awards

Honorary degrees 
 In 2009, she was awarded a Doctor Honoris Causa in Natural sciences from Leibniz University Hannover (2009).
 In 2010, Thalmann was awarded an honorary doctorate from the University of Ottawa.

Awards 
  In July 1987, Thalmann was named "Woman of the Year" by École des hautes études commerciales de Montréal for early original contribution in computer graphics in Montreal (1987).
In 2007, her film "High Fashion in Equations" has won the CGI 2007 Best International Scientific Video award and was shown at the SIGGRAPH Electronic Theatre. 
 In 2012, she has been a co-recipient of the Career Achievement Award by the Canadian Human Computer Communications Society in Toronto.
 In 2012, she received the prestigious Humboldt Research Award in Germany.
Thalmann selected as a Pioneer in Information Technology at the Heinz Nixdorf Computer Museum's Electronic Wall of Fame in Germany.

Bibliography

Filmography

References

External links
 

Computer graphics researchers
Canadian computer scientists
Canadian women computer scientists
Computer graphics professionals
Swiss computer scientists
Swiss women computer scientists
Living people
Academic staff of Université Laval
1946 births